Ervin Kurti (born 29 March 1995) is a Serbian professional footballer who plays as a forward for German club Türksport Kempten.

Club career

Early career
Kurti started playing football in one of the famous football schools in Mitrovica, Bardhi Football School, he was part of all team levels of the school from youth to junior, he besides being was part of Bardhi Football School, he was part even of Trepça (2013–2017), FK Jošanica (2017–2019; 2019–2020) and Sloga Sjenica (2019).

Novi Pazar
On 26 July 2020, Kurti joined Serbian SuperLiga side Novi Pazar, on a one-year contract and received squad number 8. Six days later, he made his debut in a 3–0 away defeat against Red Star Belgrade after coming on as a substitute at 64th minute in place of Mirza Delimeđac.

References

External links
 
 Ervin Kurti at Srbijafudbal
 

1995 births
Living people
Sportspeople from Novi Pazar
Serbian footballers
Albanians in Serbia
Kosovan footballers
Association football forwards
Football Superleague of Kosovo players
KF Trepça players
Serbian SuperLiga players
FK Novi Pazar players
FK Tutin players